Fury/Agent 13 is a comic book miniseries published by Marvel Comics in 1998.

Publication history
The series is a follow-up to a storyline in Captain America Vol. 3. With only two issues to its run, it is exceptionally short even for a limited series, and has been referred to as a "microseries".

Plot
Sharon Carter believes that Nick Fury's death at the hands of the Punisher must have been staged.

She breaks into a top-secret S.H.I.E.L.D. facility looking for proof and finds that Fury's bullet-ridden "body" is actually an LMD. Carter takes the head of the LMD to Tony Stark. He admits to having helped build it for Fury, and uses the circuitry within to gather a clue: "Fallen Angel."  The clue leads Carter to explore Fury's private office in a sunken S.H.I.E.L.D. Helicarrier. However, S.H.I.E.L.D. has arranged for security to protect the tech in the sunken Helicarrier, and they comes after her. She escapes and uses the data gained to find an energy portal hidden under the site of the original S.H.I.E.L.D. building. She jumps through the portal, which turns out to be a time portal.

Carter runs into Fury in the middle of WWII, and after holding him at gunpoint, reluctantly helps him fight off Nazis and link up with the other Howling Commandos.  Fury explains that they're not actually in the past, but in a pocket-dimension shaped by the willpower of those within it. He says he had received coded messages from Fallen Angel, the supposedly-dead original S.H.I.E.L.D. director. When he reached the location, Fallen Angel pushed him through the portal and then committed suicide. Fury tells Carter that they have to find another portal in this pocket-dimension in order to get back to reality. As the two work together to make it home, Fury explains to Carter that the reason he left her out in the cold was that he assumed she really was dead. After that they reach a portal back to reality.

Prints

See also
 1998 in comics

References

External links
 Fury/Agent 13  at the Comic Book DB

Nick Fury titles
Marvel Comics one-shots